Stalin Monument may refer to:

 Stalin Monument (Budapest)
 Stalin Monument (The Hague)
 Stalin Monument (Prague)

See also
 List of statues of Stalin